The Chinese Ambassador to Uruguay is the official representative of the People's Republic of China to the Oriental Republic of Uruguay.

List of representatives

See also
China–Uruguay relations

References 

Uruguay
China